Grevillea hirtella is a species of flowering plant in the family Proteaceae and is endemic to the west of Western Australia. It is a spreading shrub with crowded linear and divided leaves and clusters of pale pink to deep red flowers.

Description
The upper surface of the leaves is more or less glabrous and the edges are rolled under, obscuring the lower surface.

Taxonomy
This grevillea was first formally described in 1870 by George Bentham who gave it the name Grevillea pinaster var. hirtella in Flora Australiensis from specimens collected by Pemberton Walcott near Champion Bay. In 1994, Peter M. Olde and Neil R. Marriott raised the variety to species status as Grevillea hirtella in The Grevillea Book. The specific epithet (hirtella) means "somewhat hairy".

Distribution and habitat
Grevillea hirtella grows in open heathland on sandy or loamy soils in scattered populations between Mingenew and Walkaway in the Avon Wheatbelt and Geraldton Sandplains bioregions of western Western Australia.

See also
 List of Grevillea species

References

hirtella
Endemic flora of Western Australia
Eudicots of Western Australia
Proteales of Australia
Taxa named by George Bentham
Plants described in 1870